François Bellot (born February 8, 1954 in , Rochefort, Belgium) is a Belgian politician. He is a member of the Reformist Movement (MR) party. He served as the Federal Minister for Mobility and Transport in the Wilmès' caretaker Government from April 17, 2016 to October 1, 2020.

Political functions
 City of Rochefort
 CPAS Councillor of Rochefort (1982–1988)
 City councillor (1989–1994)
 Mayor of Rochefort (1995–1998, from 2001)
 Province of Namur
 Provincial Councillor (1995–1997)
 Permanent Deputy charged with Finances (1998–2000)
 Federal Representative (19 December 2000 – June 2010)
 Member of the Committee of infrastructure and public companies (2000–2010)
 Chairman of the infrastructure and public enterprises Committee (2007–2010)
 Chairman of the Special Committee of rail safety after the Buizingen train accident (2009)
 Rapporteur of the Special Committee on the Financial Crisis set up after the 2008 crisis
 Member of the Monitoring Committee of military operations abroad
 Commissioner of the Committee of inquiry into the bankruptcy of Sabena
 Senator (June 2010 – 2014)
 Chairman of the MR group (2010–2012)
 Walloon MP (2014–2016)
 Chairman of the Committee on Agriculture, tourism and sports infrastructure
 French Community MP (2014–2016)
 Member of the Committee on Higher Education and the Media
 President of the Commission "Rural Life" of the Union of Towns and Municipalities
 Federal Minister for Mobility and Transport in the Michel Government and Wilmès Government (2016–2020)

Awards 
Commander of the Order of Leopold since June 6, 2010 
Recipient of the Civic Decoration since February 6, 2008
Commander of the Order of Leopold II since April 29, 2004

References

Living people
1954 births
20th-century Belgian politicians
21st-century Belgian politicians
Rochefort, Belgium
Mayors of places in Belgium